Here are the Billboard Hot 100 number-one hits of 1979.

That year, 10 acts earned their first number one song: Gloria Gaynor, Amii Stewart, Blondie, Peaches & Herb, Anita Ward, The Knack, Robert John, M, Styx, and Rupert Holmes; only Blondie would ever have another number one hit. The Bee Gees, Donna Summer, and Chic were the only acts to have more than one song reach number one in 1979.

Chart history

Number-one artists

See also
1979 in music
List of Cash Box Top 100 number-one singles of 1979

References

Sources
Fred Bronson's Billboard Book of Number 1 Hits, 5th Edition
Joel Whitburn's Top Pop Singles 1955-2008, 12 Edition
Joel Whitburn Presents the Billboard Hot 100 Charts: The Seventies
Additional information obtained can be verified within Billboard's online archive services and print editions of the magazine.

United States Hot 100
1979